Patoptoformis ganesha is a species of moth of the family Cossidae. It is found in Nepal.

References

Moths described in 2004
Cossinae